Ordinary or The Ordinary often refer to:

Music
 Ordinary (EP) (2015), by South Korean group Beast
 Ordinary (Every Little Thing album) (2011)
 "Ordinary" (Two Door Cinema Club song) (2016)
 "Ordinary" (Wayne Brady song) (2008)
 "Ordinary", song by Train from Alive at Last (2004)

Religion
 Ordinary (Catholic Church), a supervisor, typically a bishop, in charge of a territory comparable to a diocese, or a major superior of a religious institute
 Ordinary (church officer), an officer of a church or civic authority who by reason of office has ordinary power to execute laws
 Ordinary (liturgy), a set of texts in Roman Catholic and other Western Christian liturgies that are generally invariable
 Ordinary (lecture), a type of lecture given in universities of the Middle Ages

Other
 An archaic usage meaning tavern
 Ordinary (film), a 2012 Malayalam-language film
 Ordinary (heraldry), a simple geometrical figure displayed on a shield
 Ordinary of arms, a roll or register of coats of arms, arranged systematically by design
 Ordinary, Kentucky, an unincorporated community
 Ordinary, Virginia, an unincorporated community
 The Ordinary, novel by Jim Grimsley
 The Ordinary, play by William Cartwright
 The Ordinary, Canada-based skincare brand founded by Brandon Truaxe
 Ordinary bicycle, the original type, the penny-farthing